Tarnogóra  is a village in the administrative district of Gmina Izbica, within Krasnystaw County, Lublin Voivodeship, in eastern Poland.

The village has a population of 952.

References

Villages in Krasnystaw County
Ruthenian Voivodeship
Lublin Governorate
Lublin Voivodeship (1919–1939)